From the Yellow Room is the third studio album by South Korean pianist Yiruma. It features one of his most famous piano pieces, "Kiss the Rain".

Track listing

External links 
 Yiruma's website
 Yiruma on Myspace

2003 albums
Yiruma albums